Wide Area Telephone Service (WATS) was a flat-rate long-distance service offering for customer dial-type telecommunications in some of the countries that adhere to the North American Numbering Plan.  The service was between a given customer phone (also known as a "station") and stations within specified geographic rate areas, employing a single telephone line between the customer location and the serving central office. Each access line could be arranged for outward (OUT-WATS) or inward (IN-WATS) service, or both.

WATS was introduced by the Bell System in 1961 as a primitive long-distance flat-rate plan by which a business could obtain a special line with an included number of hours ('measured time' or 'full-time') of long-distance calling to a specified area. These lines were most often connected to private branch exchanges in large businesses. WATS lines were the basis for the first direct-dial toll-free +1-800 numbers (intrastate in 1966, interstate in 1967); by 1976, WATS brought AT&T Corporation a billion dollars in annual revenue.

For outbound calls, the 1984 AT&T divestiture brought multiple competitors offering similar services using standard business telephone lines; the special WATS line was ultimately supplanted by other flat-rate offerings. The requirement that an inbound toll-free number terminate at a special WATS line or fixed-rate service was also rendered obsolete by the 1980s due to intelligent network capability and technological improvement in the +1800 service. A toll-free number may now terminate at a T-carrier line, at any standard local telephone number or at one of multiple destinations based on time of day, call origin, cost or other factors.

Outbound WATS
For Outbound WATS, the United States was divided into geographical Bands 0 through 5. Band zero was intrastate calling and bands 1 through 5 (or 6) were interstate calls that were progressively further from the originating number. Historically, the higher band number carried a higher price per month or per minute. These lines could be used for outbound long-distance only; not local. In the U.S., interstate WATS lines could not be used for intrastate calls, and vice versa. With wider availability of inexpensive long distance using regular business lines, OutWATS service became obsolete late in the 20th century.

InWATS

The original North American toll-free number was the Zenith number, published in one distant city (or a few cities) only. Published as "Zenith" and a five-digit number, these collect calls required operator assistance. The called party was charged for the operator-assisted call.

With "inward WATS", introduced for interstate calls by AT&T in 1967, subscribers were issued a toll-free telephone number in a designated toll-free area code. Unlike a standard collect call or a call to a Zenith number, +1800- normally may be dialed directly with no live operator. Callers within a designated area could call without incurring a toll charge as the recipient paid for the calls at a fixed rate.

The introduction of InWATS fortuitously fell around the same time as the early centralized, automated national airline and hotel reservation systems, including Sabre (American Airlines, 1963), Holidex (Holiday Inn, 1965) and Reservatron (Sheraton, 1969). Hundreds of local reservation numbers for a major chain could be replaced with one central number, backed by a national computerized reservation system.

InWATS exchanges were assigned to Canada and other North American Numbering Plan countries, but the original InWATS in each country accepted domestic calls only. Initially +1800NN2XXXX numbers were U.S. intrastate and specific prefixes (such as +1800387 Toronto and +1800267 Ottawa) were assigned to Canada. In the 1970s, AT&T's internal routing guides included separate U.S. and Canadian 1-800 exchange maps which looked much like area code maps as each geographic area code had one or more specific freephone exchange prefixes. Sheraton's 8003253535, one of the notable early adopters in late 1969, was hard-wired into St. Louis area code 314; 1800HOLIDAY at that time could not be a U.S. number if the 1800465 prefix was hard-wired to Thunder Bay's area code 807. Any attempt to call a foreign +1800 gave a pre-recorded error, "the number you have dialed is not available from your calling area."

Like the OutWATS service, AT&T's InWATS was divided into intrastate and interstate, with interstate calls priced into five or six "bands" of calling. This favored placement of US national call centers in low-population Midwestern states such as Nebraska, whose central location meant a carefully situated "band 3" number reaching halfway across the US in every direction could potentially reach 47 states. A San Diego call center would be less fortunate; even with "band 6" (the most expensive lines), its 'national' number would be unreachable to millions as California is a populous state and intrastate calls needed a separate toll-free number.

The original InWATS system was supplanted by "Advanced 800 Service" in the 1980s. Modern systems eliminated requirements tying toll-free numbers to dedicated flat-rate inbound WATS lines. Direct inward dial, introduced in 1983, allowed one trunk to carry calls for multiple numbers. AT&T's monopoly on U.S. toll-free number routing ended in 1986, encouraging flexibility in order to match rivals Sprint and MCI. By 1989, fixed "bands" of coverage area had been largely replaced by distance-based billing, a growing number of 1800 numbers were being terminated at standard local business or residence lines and one number could be sent to multiple locations based on call origin, least-cost routing or time of day routing. RespOrgs were established in the U.S. in 1993 and Canada in 1994 to provide toll free number portability using the Service Management System (SMS/800) database.  Calls from Canada and the U.S., intrastate and interstate, could terminate at the same 1800 number, even via different carriers. Vanity numbers became easier to obtain as a toll-free exchange prefix was no longer tied to a geographic location. By the 21st century, Voice over IP placed toll-free and foreign exchange numbers into the hands of even the smallest users, to whom dedicated inbound lines under the original InWATS model would have been prohibitively expensive.

WATS and the Civil Rights Movement
During the Civil Rights Movement in the U.S., activist organizations such as SNCC used WATS as a convenient way for eyewitnesses on the ground to convey information quickly. Notes from these phone calls were compiled into "WATS Line Reports" and mailed to civil rights leaders, the media, the Justice Department, and others involved in the events. WATS was also how organizations communicated with local leaders across the country. A "Bay Area Friends of SNCC" newsletter in 1965 described WATS:
The WATS (Wide Area Telephone Service) line is the heart of all SNCC security and communications. For a flat monthly rate, an unlimited number of calls can be dialed directly to any place in the country — or the state — depending on what line one uses. The Jackson office has a state-wide line, the Atlanta office has the national WATS line. Both run on a 24-hour basis. A project worker can call in news of any incident, threat or major activity to the Jackson office. The WATS operator there takes down the details and relays it to Atlanta if the event is of national importance. In the case of a threat or incident involving Federal laws, Jackson will notify the FBI and the Justice Department. Atlanta uses its national WATS line to notify SNCC groups around the country.
See "External Links" for digitized WATS Line Reports.

References

External links

Archived WATS Line Reports from SNCC and COFO, 1964 to 1966, from Veterans of the Civil Rights Movement 
"Bloody Sunday" report from SNCC, which incorporates incoming WATS calls
Freedom Summer Collection, which includes many WATS Line Reports, at the Wisconsin Historical Society

Telecommunications in Canada
Telecommunications in the United States